The Americas Zone is one of the three zones of the regional Davis Cup competition in 2016.

In the Americas Zone there are three different tiers, called groups, in which teams compete against each other to advance to the upper tier. Winners in Group II advance to the Americas Zone Group I. Teams who lose their respective ties will compete in the relegation play-offs, with winning teams remaining in Group II, whereas teams who lose their play-offs will be relegated to the Americas Zone Group III in 2017.

Participating nations

Seeds: 

Remaining nations:

Draw

 and  relegated to Group III in 2017.
 promoted to Group I in 2017.

First round

Peru vs. Uruguay

Mexico vs. Guatemala

El Salvador vs. Puerto Rico

Venezuela vs. Paraguay

Second round

Peru vs. Mexico

El Salvador vs. Venezuela

Play-offs

Guatemala vs. Uruguay

Paraguay vs. Puerto Rico

Third round

Peru vs. Venezuela

References

External links
Official Website

Americas Zone Group II
Davis Cup Americas Zone